The Fukushima Himba Stakes (Japanese 福島牝馬ステークス) is a Grade 3 horse race for Thoroughbred fillies and mares aged four and over, run in April over a distance of 1800 metres on turf at Fukushima Racecourse.

The Fukushima Himba Stakes was first run in 2004 and has held Grade 3 status ever since. The race was run at Niigata Racecourse in 2011.

Winners since 2000

See also
 Horse racing in Japan
 List of Japanese flat horse races

References

Turf races in Japan